Boris Hambourg (– 24 November 1954) was a Russian Canadian cellist who settled in Toronto, Ontario, and made his career in the United States, Canada, England and Europe.

Early life 

Hambourg was born in Voronez, south Russia, the third son of Michael and Catherine Hambourg, and the younger brother of the pianist Mark Hambourg (1879–1960) and the violinist Jan Hambourg (1882–1947). The three sons came with their family to London in 1890; they were encouraged in music from an early age, and were taught instruments which enabled them to play together in chamber music ensemble, as the Hambourg Trio. Boris began his studies in 1892, and after devoting some time to piano, decided to specialize in the cello. He studied at the Hoch Conservatory in Frankfort-am-Main from 1898 to 1903, taking lessons from Herbert Walenn and later from Hugo Becker.

Career 
In 1903 Hambourg made a concert tour of Australia and New Zealand, and in 1904 he took part in the first Tchaikovsky Festival in Germany, held at Pyrmont. In 1904-1905 he went to Belgium at the invitation of Eugène Ysaÿe, who further developed his musical art in interpretation and style. Boris Hambourg made his London debut in 1905, and his American debut in 1910. He was a member of the Hambourg String Quartet (the other members being Jan Hambourg, John Robinson and Eric Coates).

Hambourg moved with his family to Canada, becoming a  naturalised Canadian in 1910. He performed with his family trio, and appeared as a soloist in many different places before settling in Toronto, where he took part in founding the Hambourg Conservatory of Music (a private school which closed in 1951), and became its Director.

He toured frequently with Toronto's Hart House String Quartet, and continued to appear in concert with many orchestras in the United States and Europe, and in England appeared as soloist with the Queen's Hall Orchestra and the London Symphony Orchestra. He remained a member of the Hambourg Trio until his death in 1954.

Sources 
A. Eaglefield-Hull, Dictionary of Modern Music and Musicians (Dent, London 1924).

1884 births
1885 births
1954 deaths
Russian classical cellists
20th-century Russian Jews
Canadian people of Russian-Jewish descent
Hoch Conservatory alumni
20th-century classical musicians
Emigrants from the Russian Empire to Canada
Naturalized citizens of Canada
20th-century cellists